Country Code: +692
International Call Prefix: 00

National Significant Numbers (NSN): seven-digits

Format: +692 yyy xxxx or +692 yyyy xxx

Areas in the Marshall Islands

See also 
 Communications in the Marshall Islands

References

Marshall Islands
Communications in the Marshall Islands